Swords Against Darkness V is an anthology of fantasy stories, edited by Andrew J. Offutt. It was first published in paperback by Zebra Books in November 1979.

Summary
The book collects twelve short stories and novelettes by various fantasy authors, together with a foreword by Offutt.

Contents
"Foreword to the Fifth Volume of Swords Against Darkness" (Andrew J. Offutt) 
"The Mouths of Light" (Ramsey Campbell) 
"Perfidious Amber" (Tanith Lee) 
"Awake, Awake, Ye Northern Winds" (Simon Green)
"Rats" (Robert Fester) 
"The Forging" (Robin Kincaid) 
"Hungry Grass" (Keith Taylor) 
"The Tale of the Cat, the Mouse, the Sorcerer, and the Children" (Edward DeGeorge) 
"Golden Vanity" (James Anderson) 
"The Castle of Kites and Crows" (Darrell Schweitzer) 
"The Scream of the Rose" (Paul McGuire) 
"Joni" (Gordon Linzner) 
"Druin's Heritage" (Richard K. Lyon)

External links
ISFD entry for Swords Against Darkness V

1979 anthologies
Fantasy anthologies
Zebra Books books